"Oye Mi Canto" is a reggaeton single by N.O.R.E. The song was originally released in 2004 as the lead single from the album 1 Fan a Day, which was heretofore unreleased. It is his second biggest hit, peaking at number 12 on the Billboard Hot 100. It was later included on the 2006 album N.O.R.E. y la Familia...Ya Tú Sabe. The song features Nina Sky and reggaeton artists Gem Star, Daddy Yankee and Big Mato. The song originally featured Tego Calderón in place of Daddy Yankee but was later changed for the video. However, the Tego version was released by famous reggaeton label Planet Records Italy, instead of Island Def Jam, N.O.R.E.'s original label. It's N.O.R.E.'s first venture into the increasingly popular Latin genre reggaeton.

In a 2006 interview with MTV, N.O.R.E. says of the single, "I fell in love with this music. I did this joint originally for a mixtape. The Latino people haven't been spoken to in a while, since [Big] Pun died. They haven't felt like they had something proud [in hip-hop] to stand on, so being both Latin and black, I wanted to rep my Latin side for once. Why not do it with this new music, instead of doing a Spanish rap record? This is what speaks for the inner-city Latino youth."

The song was included on Billboards 12 Best Dancehall & Reggaeton Choruses of the 21st century at number two.

Track listings

 Def Jam single (Daddy Yankee version)
 "Oye Mi Canto" (radio)
 "Oye Mi Canto" (explicit)
 "Oye Mi Canto" (instrumental)
 "4 a Minute" (radio)
 "4 a Minute" (explicit)

 Planet Records "Reggaeton Mix" single (Tego Calderón version)
 "Oye Mi Canto" ("original" dirty mix)
 "Oye Mi Canto" (clean mix)
 "Oye Mi Canto" (instrumental)

Def Jam 1-track single (Daddy Yankee version)
 "Oye Mi Canto" (radio edit)

Translation 
"Oye Mi Canto" literally translates to "Hear My Song" in English. Oye is the imperative conjugated form of tuteo of the infinitive verb oír (to hear). [For the second singular person tú (Oye) in imperative, nor vos (Oí / Oid), neither usted (Oiga), the personal pronoun in spanish here is implicit].

Charts

Certifications

Release history

References

Spanish-language songs
2004 singles
N.O.R.E. songs
Nina Sky songs
Daddy Yankee songs
Tego Calderón songs
Spanglish songs
Music videos directed by Gil Green
Def Jam Recordings singles
2004 songs
Reggaeton songs